Hayriye Ayşe Nermin Neftçi  (1924 – August 20, 2003) was a Turkish female jurist, politician and former government minister.

Hayriye Ayşe Nermin Neftçi was born in Istanbul, Turkey in 1924. She graduated from the Ankara University Law School.

Following the 1969 general election, she entered the parliament as a deputy of Muş. She became so the first Turkish female politician ever elected from the eastern provinces of Turkey after the establishment of democracy. She served in decision-making boards of the Republican People's Party (CHP). In the later years of the parliamentary term, she was appointed Deputy Speaker of the Grand National Assembly, a position that was held for the first time by a woman. She did not participate in the 1973 general election. However, she was taken into the cabinet of Sadi Irmak as the Ministry of Culture serving from November 17, 1974 to March 31, 1975.

During the voting in the parliament on April 24, 1972 about the endorsement of the execution of three young people, who were sentenced to death after the coup d'état of March 12, 1971. Neftçi was among the 48 opponents of the 323 present members of the 450-seat parliament. The decision to execute these three members of the Marxist-Leninist revolutionary People's Liberation Army of Turkey (abbreviated THKO), was accepted by 273 votes. Following the state president's approval, Deniz Gezmiş, Yusuf Aslan and Hüseyin İnan were hanged on May 6, 1972 that caused a long-lasting controversy in the country in the aftermath.

Nermin Neftçi wrote columns in various dailies and periodicals. She authored a book titled "O Yakadan Bu Yakaya" about the structure of the Turkish language and the folklore of the Iraqi Turkmens in Kirkuk.

Neftçi died aged 79 on August 20, 2003 in Bodrum, Muğla Province. She was mother of two sons, Salih (1947–2009), and Sinan.

References

1924 births
Lawyers from Istanbul
Ankara University Faculty of Law alumni
Politicians from Istanbul
Republican People's Party (Turkey) politicians
Deputies of Muş
Members of the 13th Parliament of Turkey
Members of the 14th Parliament of Turkey
Republican Reliance Party politicians
Ministers of Culture of Turkey
Women government ministers of Turkey
Government ministers of Turkey
Members of the 38th government of Turkey
2003 deaths
Deputy Speakers of the Grand National Assembly of Turkey
20th-century Turkish lawyers
20th-century Turkish women politicians